Aleksandr Pavlovich Rakitsky (Russian: Александр Павлович Ракитский; born 1 July 1946 in Russia) is a Russian football manager who last worked as head coach of the Burundi national football team. He is a former player.

Career

Rakitsky started his managerial career with AS Inter Star. In 1993, he was appointed head coach of the Burundi national football team, a position he held until 1996.

References

External links 
 Alexander Rakitsky: Muzungu in the country of cannibals 
 Heroes of the Past | Alexander Rakitsky 
 Legionnaires from Burundi: how in 1996 Torpedo almost replenished African football players
 Alexander Rakitsky - 68! 
 From Chulkov to Shunin. Satellites Yashin

Living people
1946 births
Soviet footballers
FC Dynamo Moscow players
FC Dynamo Saint Petersburg players
FC Torpedo Moscow players
FC Karpaty Lviv players
FC Asmaral Moscow players
Soviet football managers
Russian football managers
Russian expatriate football managers
Expatriate football managers in Burundi
Burundi national football team managers
Association football goalkeepers